Pyotr Leschenko. Everything That Was... is a Russian biographical television mini-series, directed by Vladimir Kott, starring Konstantin Khabensky as Pyotr Leshchenko.

The show depicts the most significant events and milestones in the singer's life: childhood and youth, battles in the First World War, the beginning of his career, his success, touring Romanian-occupied Odessa, his women, and his tragic death in a prison in Romania in 1954.

The first episode of the series aired on Inter on 14 October 2013. From 22 until 25 May 2017, it was shown on 1TV.

Cast

Konstantin Khabensky  as Pyotr Leshchenko
Ivan Stebunov as Pyotr Leshchenko in his youth
Andrey Merzlikin as Georgy Khrapak
Miriam Sehon as Zhenya Zakitt, the first wife of Pyotr Leshchenko
Viktoriya Isakova as Ekaterina Zavyalova
Timofey Tribuntsev as Captain Sokolov
Boris Kamorzin as Colonel Barankevich
Aleksei Kravchenko as Sergey Nikanorovich Burenin, commandant of Bucharest
Yevgenia Dobrovolskaya as Maria Burenina
Sergey Byzgu as Daniil Zeltser, the impresario of Pyotr Leshchenko
Yevgeny Sidikhin as Colonel of the Russian Imperial Army
Dmitry Lipinsky as Andrei Kozhemyakin, Pyotr Leshchenko's childhood friend
Nikolai Dobrynin as Konstantin, father of Pyotr Leshchenko
Vera Panfilova as Zlata Zobar, a gypsy
Mikhail Bogdasarov as Kostake, the owner of the restaurant
Semyon Furman as Chorbe
Elena Lotova as Vera Georgievna Belousova, second wife of Pyotr Leshchenko
Olga Lerman as Katya Zavyalova in her youth
Sergei Frolov as Georges Ypsilanti, head of Pyotr Leshchenko's orchestra
Alexander Klukvin as Feodor Chaliapin
Oleg Mazurov as Vasil Zobar, a Gypsy
Aleksandr Adabashyan as Paul, the bartender
Yevgeny Berezovsky as Zaletayev, the captain
Yuri Anpilogov as Hauptmann
Sergei Belyaev as Popescu, General
Oksana Burlai-Piterova as mother of Pyotr Leshchenko
Yevgeny Gerchakov as Antonescu
Anton Fyodorov as German officer
Denis Starkov as schoolboy
Elena Muravyova as hotel attendant
Fedor Rumyantsev as sound engineer of the Columbia studio
 Rasmi Djabrailov as Mikhai

Production
Khabensky was chosen to play Pyotr Leshchenko, because the creators of the series said that he resembles the singer with his eyes, smile and an air of "nervousness".  Leshchenko's widow, Vera Belousova, met Khabensky in the late 1990s and also noted at that time that the actor reminds her of Pyotr.

Konstantin Khabensky and Ivan Stebunov took singing classes to prepare for the shooting, and performed the songs themselves in the film.

Filming took place in Moscow, Moscow Oblast, Yaroslavl, as well as in Lviv and Odessa.

References

External links

Russian drama television series
2010s Russian television series
2013 Russian television series debuts
2013 Russian television series endings
Russian-language television shows
Serial drama television series
Musical television series
Russian television miniseries
Channel One Russia original programming
Cultural depictions of pop musicians
Cultural depictions of Romani people
Cultural depictions of Romanian men
Cultural depictions of Ukrainian men
Cultural depictions of Russian men
Russian biographical television series